Gachestan may refer to:
 Gachestan, Dezful
 Gachestan (32°18′ N 49°36′ E), Dezful